Our Lady and St Thomas of Canterbury is a Grade II listed Roman Catholic church at 22 Roxborough Park, Harrow-on-the-Hill, London.

It was built in 1894 in a 14th-century style, and the architect was Arthur Young.

References

External links

Grade II listed churches in London
Churches in the London Borough of Harrow
Grade II listed buildings in the London Borough of Harrow
Roman Catholic churches in London
Churches in the Roman Catholic Diocese of Westminster